Charles Fisher (born February 2, 1976) is a former American football cornerback and was also a scout for the Seattle Seahawks. He was drafted by the Cincinnati Bengals in the second round of the 1999 NFL Draft. He played college football at West Virginia.

College career
Fisher was named to the Second-team All-Big East while at West Virginia and majored in sports management.

Professional career

Cincinnati Bengals
Fisher was drafted by the Cincinnati Bengals in the second round (33rd overall) of the 1999 NFL Draft. As a rookie in 1999, Fisher was considered the Bengals future at cornerback, winning one of two starting cornerback spots after Corey Sawyer was released. However, in week one of the 1999 NFL season, about 12 plays into the game, Fisher tore all three major ligaments in his knee, the MCL, ACL and PCL and missed the rest of the season. The injury occurred when Fisher was attempting to cover Tennessee Titans wide receiver Kevin Dyson. His injury left the Bengals thin at cornerback, having to start Artrell Hawkins and fellow rookie Rodney Heath. Following the injury, many media members claimed that Fisher's career was over. The injury would prove to never allow him to regain full health and he never played another game in the NFL. He was released by the Bengals in 2001.

Coaching career
Following his release from the Bengals, Fisher was hired as a coaching intern in the player personnel department for the Green Bay Packers. On June 16, 2003, Fisher was hired by the Seattle Seahawks as a scout. Fisher was present at the Mountaineers 2008 pro day, and was impressed by former Mountaineers running back Steve Slaton and safety Ryan Mundy. Fisher left the team after the conclusion of the 2009 season.

Fisher now works as the Director of Business Development at Octagon Football.

References

1976 births
Living people
American football cornerbacks
Cincinnati Bengals players
West Virginia Mountaineers football players
People from Aliquippa, Pennsylvania
Players of American football from Pennsylvania